The River Hiz  is a small tributary river in Hertfordshire that feeds the River Ivel that, in turn, feeds the River Great Ouse.  Starting at its source of a chalk fed spring just south of the village of Charlton, the river winds its way through the county of Hertfordshire, moving its way into and through Hitchin, where it meets the River Oughton and River Purwell.  The Hiz finally meets the River Ivel near the village of Henlow.

The Hicca Way, inaugurated in 2012, is a footpath which follows the course of the river.

The Hiz is a focal point in the town of Hitchin, with a market that takes place historically by its banks. The Hiz also runs past the Arlesey Old Moat and Glebe Meadows nature reserve in Arlesey.

Although small, the Hiz attracts a great deal of wildlife. There are many birds around this area, which include swans, ducks, coot and kingfishers. Fish inhabit the river (trout mainly) and there is also evidence of otters.

Toponymy
The z in Hiz is a Domesday-Book abbreviation for ts (or tch), and Hiz is properly pronounced "Hitch". This fact seems to be little known, and Hiz is now normally said as it is spelled. It may take its name from the Hicce tribe, who inhabited the area and gave their name to Hitchin.  Ekwall says that Hiz/Hitch is a probably back-formation from Hitchin, which in turn is the dative plural of Hicce.

Norden  says the name is derived from  a wood called Hitch, but Ekwall believes this is a conflation with Wychwood, for which the Old English is Hwiccawudu.

References

External links
 

Rivers of Hertfordshire
Rivers of Bedfordshire
Hitchin